Alcohol-related brain damage alters both the structure and function of the brain as a result of the direct neurotoxic effects of alcohol intoxication or acute alcohol withdrawal. Increased alcohol intake is associated with damage to brain regions including the frontal lobe, limbic system, and cerebellum, with widespread cerebral atrophy, or brain shrinkage caused by neuron degeneration. This damage can be seen on neuroimaging scans.

Frontal lobe damage becomes the most prominent as alcoholics age and can lead to impaired neuropsychological performance in areas such as problem solving, good judgement, and goal-directed behaviors. Impaired emotional processing results from damage to the limbic system. This may lead to troubles recognizing emotional facial expressions and "interpreting nonverbal emotional cues".

Binge drinking, or heavy episodic drinking, can lead to damage in the limbic system that occurs after a relatively short period of time. This brain damage increases the risk of alcohol-related dementia, and abnormalities in mood and cognitive abilities. Binge drinkers also have an increased risk of developing chronic alcoholism. Alcoholism is a chronic relapsing disorder that can include extended periods of abstinence followed by relapse to heavy drinking. It is also associated with many other health problems including memory disorders, high blood pressure, muscle weakness, heart problems, anaemia, low immune function, liver disease, disorders of the digestive system, and pancreatic problems. It has also been correlated with depression, unemployment, and family problems with an increased risk of domestic abuse.

Gender and parental history of alcoholism and binge drinking has an influence on susceptibility to alcohol dependence as higher levels are typically seen in males and in those with a family history.

Prevalence 
Nearly half of American alcoholics exhibit "neuropsychological disabilities [that] can range from mild to severe" with approximately two million requiring lifelong care after developing permanent and debilitating conditions. Prolonged alcohol abstinence can lead to an improvement in these disabilities. For those with mild impairments, some improvement has been seen within a year, but this can take much longer in those with higher severity damage.

Populations at risk

Adolescents and genetic factors 
The impulsivity and sensation seeking seen in adolescence may lead to increased alcohol intake and more frequent binge drinking episodes leaving adolescents particularly at risk for alcoholism. The still developing brain of adolescents is more vulnerable to the damaging neurotoxic and neurodegenerative effects of alcohol. "High impulsivity has [also] been found in families with alcoholism, suggestive of a genetic link. Thus, the genetics of impulsivity overlaps with genetic risks for alcohol use disorder and possibly alcohol neurodegeneration".

There is also a genetic risk for proinflammatory cytokine mediated alcohol-related brain damage. There is evidence that variants of these genes are involved not only in contributing to brain damage but also to impulsivity and alcohol abuse. All three of these genetic traits contribute heavily to an alcohol use disorder.

Neurological deficits 
Alcoholics can typically be divided into two categories, uncomplicated and complicated. Uncomplicated alcoholics do not have nutritional deficiency states or liver disease, but have a reduction in overall brain volume due to white matter cerebral atrophy. The severity of atrophy sustained from alcohol consumption is proportional to the rate and amount of alcohol consumed during a person's life. Complicated alcoholics may have liver damage that impacts brain structure and function and nutritional deficiencies "that can cause severe brain damage and dysfunction".

Pathophysiology
Adolescents are much more vulnerable to alcohol-related brain damage in the form of persistent changes in neuroimmune signalling from binge drinking. The endocrine system includes the hypothalamic–pituitary–adrenal axis, the hypothalamic–pituitary–gonadal axis, the hypothalamic–pituitary–thyroid axis, the hypothalamic–pituitary–growth hormone/insulin-like growth factor-1 axis, and the hypothalamic–posterior pituitary axis, as well as other sources of hormones, such as the endocrine pancreas and endocrine adipose tissue. Alcohol abuse disrupts all of these systems and causes hormonal disturbances that may result in various disorders, such as stress intolerance, reproductive dysfunction, thyroid problems, immune abnormalities, and psychological and behavioral disorders.

The cerebral atrophy that alcoholics often present with is due to alcohol induced neurotoxicity. Evidence of neurodegeneration can be supported by an increased microglia density and expression of proinflammatory cytokines in the brain. Animal studies find that heavy and regular binge drinking causes neurodegeneration in corticolimbic brain regions areas which are involved in learning and spatial memory. The corticolimbic brain regions affected include the olfactory bulb, piriform cortex, perirhinal cortex, entorhinal cortex, and the hippocampal dentate gyrus. It was found that a heavy two-day drinking binge caused extensive neurodegeneration in the entorhinal cortex with resultant learning deficits in rats.

It is unclear how the frequency and length of these binge drinking sessions impacts brain damage in humans. Humans who drank at least 100 drinks (male) or 80 drinks (female) per month (concentrated to 21 occasions or less per month) throughout a three-year period had impaired decision-making skills compared to non-binge drinkers. An MRI brain scan found that levels of N-acetylaspartate (NAA), a metabolite biomarker for neural integrity, was lower in binge drinkers. Additionally, abnormal brain metabolism, a loss of white brain matter in the frontal lobe, and higher parietal gray matter NAA levels were found. This shows a correlation between binge drinking, poor executive functioning, and working memory. A decrease in frontal lobe NAA levels is associated with impaired executive functioning and processing speed in neuro-performance tests.

The volume of the corpus callosum, a large white matter tract that connects the two cerebral hemispheres, is shown to decrease with alcohol abuse due to a loss of myelination. This integration between the two cerebral hemispheres and cognitive function is affected. A limited amount of myelin can be restored with alcohol abstinence, leading to transient neurological deficits.

Alcohol abuse affects neurons in the frontal cortex that typically have a large soma, or cell body. This type of neuron is more susceptible to Alzheimer's disease and normal aging. Research is still being conducted to determine whether there is a direct link between excessive alcohol consumption and Alzheimer's disease.

Higher order functioning of the cerebral cortex is organized by the cerebellum. In those with cerebral atrophy, Purkinje cells, or the cerebellar output neurons, in the vermis are reduced in number by 43%. This large reduction in Purkinje cells causes a decrease in high order cerebral cortex organization. The cerebellum is also responsible for refining crude motor output from the primary motor cortex. When this refinement is missing, symptoms such as unsteadiness and ataxia will present. A potential cause of chronic alcoholic cerebellar dysfunction is an alteration of GABA-A receptor. This dysfunction causes an increase in the neurotransmitter GABA in cerebellar Purkinje cells, granule cells, and interneurons leading to a disruption in normal cell signaling.

Kindling and excitotoxicity 
Binge drinkers and alcoholics who go through multiple detoxifications show prefrontal cortex dysfunction ,as its known that alcohol has a long-term effects on prefrontal cortex function, leading to impairments in executive control tasks. Animal studies show that repeated alcohol withdrawals are associated with a significantly impaired ability to learn new information. Alcohol's acute effects on GABAergic enhancement and NMDA suppression causes alcohol induced neurotoxicity and kindling, or worsening of alcohol withdrawal symptoms with each subsequent withdrawal period. This may cause CNS depression leading to acute tolerance to these withdrawal effects. This tolerance is followed by a damaging rebound effect during withdrawal. This rebound causes hyperexcitability of neurotransmission systems. If this hyperexcitability state occurs multiple times, kindling and neurotoxicity can occur leading to increased alcohol-related brain damage. Damaging excitotoxicity may also occur as a result of repeated withdrawals. Similar to people who have gone through multiple detoxifications, binge drinkers show a higher rate of emotional disturbance due to these damaging effects.

Thiamine deficiency 

Thiamine is a vitamin your body needs for growth, development, and cellular function, as well as converting food into energy. Thiamin is naturally present in some foods, added to some food products, and available as a dietary supplement. A nutritional deficiency in thiamine can worsen alcohol-related brain damage. There is a genetic component to thiamine deficiency that causes intestinal malabsorption. A nutritional vitamin deficiency state that is caused by thiamin deficiency which is seen most commonly in alcoholics leads to Wernicke's encephalopathy and Alcoholic Korsakoff syndrome (AKS) which frequently occur simultaneously, known as Wernicke–Korsakoff syndrome (WKS). This disorder is preventable through supplementation of the diet by thiamin and an awareness by health professionals to treat ‘at risk’ patients with thiamin.thiamine deficiency may occur in upwards of 80% of patients with alcoholism however, only ≈13% of such individuals develop WKS,116 raising the possibility that a genetic predisposition to WKS may exist in some individuals. Lesions, or brain abnormalities, are typically located in the diencephalon which result in anterograde and retrograde amnesia, or memory loss.

Neuroimaging 
Neuroimaging is used to study the effect that alcohol has on the brain. The two main imaging methods are hemodynamic and electromagnetic. These techniques have allowed for the study of the functional, biochemical, and anatomical changes of the brain due to prolonged alcohol abuse. Neuroimaging provides valuable information in determining the risk an individual has for developing alcohol dependence and the efficacy of potential treatment.

Hemodynamic methods 

Hemodynamic methods record changes in blood volume, blood flow, blood oxygenation, and energy metabolism to produce images. Positron emission tomography (PET) and single-photon emission computed tomography (SPECT) are common techniques that require the injection of a radioactively labeled molecule, such as glucose, to allow for proper visualization. After injection, the patient is then observed while performing mental tasks, such as a memory task. PET and SPECT studies have confirmed and expanded previous findings stating that the prefrontal cortex is particularly susceptible to decreased metabolism in alcohol abusing patients.

Magnetic resonance imaging (MRI) and functional magnetic resonance imaging (fMRI) are other commonly used tenichiques. These methods are noninvasive, and have no radioactive risk involved. The fMRI method records the metabolic changes in a particular brain structure or region during a mental task. To detect damage to white matter, the standard MRI is not sufficient. An MRI derivative technique known as diffusion tensor imaging (DTI) is used to determine the orientation and integrity of specific nerve pathways, allowing the detection of damage. When imaging those with alcoholism, the DTI results show that heavy drinking disrupts the microstructure of nerve fibers. Another MRI derivative technique, magnetic resonance spectroscopy imaging (MRSI), can provide further information about the brain's neurochemistry and can detect the distribution of certain metabolites, neurotransmitters, and alcohol.

Electromagnetic methods 
While the hemo-dynamic methods are effective for observing spatial and chemical changes, they cannot show the time course of these changes. Electromagnetic imaging methods are capable of capturing real-time changes in the brain's electrical currents. Electroencephalography (EEG) imaging utilizes small electrodes that are attached to the scalp. The recordings are averaged by a technique known as event-related potentials (ERP). This is done to determine the time sequence of activity after being exposed to a stimulus, such as a word or image. Magnetoencephalography (MEG) is another imaging method that utilizes sensors. This measures the magnetic field created as a result of the brain's electrical activity. These techniques are noninvasive, harmless, and  provide a large amount of detail regarding the order and timing of electrical activity. The poor spatial imaging of these methods are a large downside.

These neuroimaging methods have found that alcohol alters the nervous system on multiple levels. This includes impairment of lower order brainstem functions and higher order functioning, such as problem solving. These methods have also shown differences in electrical brain activity and responsiveness when comparing alcohol-dependent and healthy individuals.

Clinical applications 

In Korsakoff patients, MRI shows atrophy of the thalamus and mamillary bodies. PET showed decreased metabolism, and therefore decreased activity in the thalamus and other diencephalon structures. Uncomplicated alcoholics, those with chronic Wernicke's encephalopathy (WE), and Korsakoff psychosis showed significant neuronal loss in the frontal cortex, white matter, hippocampus, and basal forebrain. Uncomplicated alcoholics were seen to have a shrinkage in raphe neurons, the mamillary bodies, and the thalamus.

Treatment and prevention 
Alcohol-related brain damage can have drastic effects on the individuals affected and their loved ones. The options for treatment are very limited compared to other disorders. Although limited, most patients with alcohol-related cognitive deficits experienced slight improvement of their symptoms over the first two to three months of treatment. Others have said to seen increase in cerebral metabolism as soon as one month after treatment.

Education on the prevention of alcoholism is the best supported method of avoiding alcohol-related brain damage. By providing information that studies have found on risk factors and the mechanisms of damage, the efforts to find an effective treatment may increase. This may also reduce mortality by influencing doctors to pay closer attention to the warning signs.

References

Alcohol abuse
Neurology
Sedatives
Addiction psychiatry
Hypnotics